Jamie Hunt may refer to:

 Jamie Hunt (ice hockey) (born 1984), Canadian ice hockey defenceman
 Jamie Hunt (sailor) (born 1979), New Zealand sailor

See also 
 James Hunt (disambiguation)